The Swedish Sports Confederation (RF) is the umbrella organisation of the Swedish sports movement. Through its member organisations, it has three million members in 22,000 clubs. The Confederation was formed on 31 May 1903. Its present chairman, since 2015, is Björn Eriksson.

Tasks
According to the website, their tasks are to:
Speak on behalf of the united sports movement in contacts with politicians, the government and other institutions/organisations 
Coordinate the sports movement in fields like research and development 
Provide service in areas where these cannot or don't want to build up their own competence 
In certain areas act in place of the government, e g through distributing governmental grants to sports

Member organisations
Specialised sports federations affiliated to the Swedish Sports Confederation:

 * Also member of the Swedish Olympic Committee

List of presidents
The Confederation has had the following presidents:

Crown Prince Gustaf Adolf (later Gustaf VI Adolf), unknown-1933
Prince Gustaf Adolf, Duke of Västerbotten, 1933–1947
Prince Bertil, Duke of Halland, 1947–1991
Arne Ljungqvist, 1991–2001
Gunnar Larsson, 2001–2005
Karin Mattsson Weijber, 2005–2015
Björn Eriksson, 2015–present

Hacking
In 2018, the Swedish Sports Confederation reported the Russian-linked group Fancy Bear was responsible for an attack on its computers, targeting records of athletes' doping tests.

Esports 
The Swedish Sports Confederation held a vote on admitting esports into the federation with a negative result. This had an adverse effect on the Dota 2 esports event The International 2020, which was originally planned to be hosted at the Avicii Arena in Stockholm before being postponed due to the COVID-19 pandemic. Because the event could not be covered by the exemptions from pandemic restrictions in the country that other sporting events had, it was moved to Romania in 2021.

References

External links
Riksidrottsförbundet

 
1903 establishments in Sweden
Organizations established in 1903